Puyméras is a commune in the Vaucluse department in the Provence-Alpes-Côte d'Azur region in southeastern France.

Main sights
Church of St. Michael, originally built in Romanesque style
Clock Tower, remade in the 18th century
Castle, ruined during the French Revolution
14th century defensive walls, with a circular tower near the Sabrun Gate

See also
Communes of the Vaucluse department

References

Communes of Vaucluse